Munshi Rampal is an Indian politician and former Member of Parliament from Nagina (Lok Sabha constituency. He is state president- Uttar Pradesh in Rashtriya Lok Dal political party.

Early life and education 
Rampal completed Diploma in Civil Engineering in 1979 from UP Technical Education Parishad.

Political career 
Munshi Rampal is an Indian senior politician and has been Member of Parliament. He is national president of Akhil Bhartiya Khatik Samaj.

References 

Living people
1957 births
Indian politicians
Rashtriya Lok Dal politicians